Escapee or Escapees may refer to:

 A person who has escaped from imprisonment or confinement, particularly:
 A fugitive
 A person who has made a prison escape
 A defector from an authoritarian regime
 "Escapee", a song from the 2011 Architecture in Helsinki album, Moment Bends
 The Escapees, alternate title of the 1981 film, Les Paumées du Petit Matin
 OnEscapee,  1997 action-adventure video game